Def Jam South was the music division of Def Jam Recordings. The label focused primarily on southern acts. It was best known for launching the career of Ludacris and his own imprint, Disturbing tha Peace. In 2004, following the signing of Young Jeezy and hip-hop's overdominance of trap music, the division was folded into Def Jam.

Company history

History
In the late 1990s, hip hop's main popularity moved from West Coast hip hop and East Coast hip hop to Southern hip hop. Co-founder of Def Jam Recordings, Russell Simmons, wanted to capitalize off of the success of southern rap. He recruited Scarface, a southern rap legend and former member of the Geto Boys to be the head of the label and, by 1999, the label was established. Later that year, a former Atlanta DJ named Chris Luva Luva began rapping under the moniker Ludacris and released his debut solo album, Incognegro, independently on his own record label Disturbing tha Peace. Scarface listened to the album while visiting Atlanta and made a deal to distribute Ludacris and his DTP imprint through Def Jam. Ludacris became one of the biggest stars in the southern hip hop market and would lead the Def Jam South division to great heights with the releases of Back for the First Time (2000), Word of Mouf (2001) and Chicken-N-Beer (2003). Scarface would end up releasing only one album under Def Jam South, The Fix, in August 2002, as he left the label for Rap-A-Lot Records soon after. Following this, Universal Music Group could not afford to finance the label's division anymore, due to the ongoing music piracy crisis, so on, Def Jam South was folded into the master generality of Def Jam Recordings in 2004, as they were in the process of signing then-newcomer Young Jeezy.

"Unofficial" revival (2005)
In the summer of 2005, Atlanta rapper Young Jeezy would release his debut album, Let's Get It: Thug Motivation 101. It would later go platinum and claim a so-called "revival" of the label. In 2009, DJ Khaled was named president of Def Jam South. DJ Khaled left Def Jam South in 2011 after his label, We the Best Music, would be a part of Cash Money Records, a division of Def Jam's sister Universal Music label, Republic Records. There has been no official releases under Def Jam South, as of 2022.

Despite the shutdown, an official Spotify playlist exists under the label's profile with the division name, included with songs by Ludacris, Jeezy and recent Def Jam signees Fredo Bang and Kaash Paige.

Former Artists
Big Boi
DJ Khaled
Ludacris
Scarface
Young Jeezy

Discography

References

Hip hop record labels
Labels distributed by Universal Music Group
Def Jam Recordings